Bloor station may refer to
 Bloor GO Station, a GO Transit commuter railway station
 Bloor–Yonge (TTC), a Toronto Transit Commission subway station